SNDP Yogam Branch No.1A, Anandasramam located at Vazhappally, in Changanacherry town, Kottayam district. The Asramam was blessed by the footprint of Sree Narayana Guru, a famous saint and social reformer from Kerala.
Anandasramam was inaugurated by Mahatma Gandhi.(Kolla Varsham 1109, 6th Makaram, On Friday 10.35 AM)

https://web.archive.org/web/20131104201759/http://www.anandasramam.in/history/%23

Buildings and structures in Kottayam district